Nikolaos Apostolidis (Greek:Νικόλαος Αποστολίδης; 1856 - 1919), was a biologist, naturalist, professor, dean, author, and politician.  He replaced Iraklis Mitsopoulos as the second director of the Zoological Museum of the University of Athens.  He served as Dean of the Philosophical School, Rector of the University of Athens, and Minister of Economics.  He popularized natural science and was one of the most prolific Greek naturalists of the 20th century.  He studied countless species of animals.

Nikolaos was born in Volos to the aristocratic family Apostolidis.  He migrated to Athens to attend school and eventually studied at the University of Athens, University of Geneva, and the Sorbonne University.  He completed his doctoral studies at the Sorbonne in the field of natural science under the supervision of Henri de Lacaze-Duthiers.  He returned to Greece and became a high school teacher and professor at the University of Athens.  He expanded the Laboratory of Zoology at the Zoological Museum which was part of the University of Athens and published several scientific papers on zoology while introducing systematic experimental zoology to Greece.  He died in Athens in 1919.

Biography 
He was born in Volos in 1856 to the aristocratic family Apostolidis. He was the son of Christos Apostolidis and he had 3 brothers Pericles, Margaritis, and Aristides.  Nikolaos eventually married Sophia Petrou Kiappe the great-granddaughter of German surgeon Heinrich Treiber.  Treiber actively participated in the Greek War of Independence as a surgeon and was one of the doctors who fought for the life of the English poet Lord Byron. Treiber later became the private doctor of King Otto and one of the first medical professors at the University of Athens.  He remained in Greece for the rest of his life.  Sophia and Nikolaos had three children 
Alexandra, Christos and Iosif.  Christos became a doctor.

Nikolaos completed his primary education in Athens and studied Physics at the University of Athens.  He continued his studies at the University of Geneva from 1877 – 1879 and eventually migrated to Paris where he studied zoology at the Sorbonne University with Henri de Lacaze-Duthiers.  In 1881, he was awarded a doctorate degree and his thesis was entitled Anatomy and Embryology of Ophiurs.  He returned to Greece one year later and became professor of zoology while also teaching natural history at the local high school.  He continued his research on ophiurs in echinoderms. 

By September 1894, he was appointed full professor of zoology at the University of Athens, a position he held for 22 years; moreover, he was also director of the Zoological Museum and participated in countless international scientific conferences.  By the academic year 1909-1910, he assumed the position of rector of the University of Athens, and six years later around 1916 and 1917, he served as Minister of Economics during the Interim Government of Spyridon Lambros after which he abandoned the post for health reasons.  He did extensive research on agricultural zoology and published several scientific papers on zoology, he also introduced systematic experimental zoology to Greece.  He significantly expanded the Zoological Museum at the University of Athens and oversaw the Laboratory of Zoology.

Literary works

References

Bibliography

1856 births
1919 deaths
19th-century Greek educators
19th-century Greek scientists
Academic staff of the National and Kapodistrian University of Athens
People from Volos
Politicians from Athens
Scientists from Athens